Zanhi (also Romanized as Zanhī) is a village in Shamil Rural District, Takht District, Bandar Abbas County, Hormozgan Province, Iran. At the 2006 census, its population was 42, in 12 families.

References 

Populated places in Bandar Abbas County